The MTV Video Music Award for Song of the Year is an award that is given at the annual MTV Video Music Awards. The award was first introduced in 2018 and is one of the biggest awards given at the award show.

Recipients

Artists with multiple nominations
 3 nominations
Dua Lipa

 2 nominations
Ariana Grande
Billie Eilish
Bruno Mars
Cardi B
Doja Cat
Drake
Lady Gaga
Megan Thee Stallion
Post Malone

References

 
Awards established in 2018
2018 establishments in the United States
American music awards